324th Division or 324th Infantry Division may refer to:

 324th Rifle Division, of the Soviet Union
 324th Division (Vietnam)